The 2015 Niger raid was an unsuccessful assault on the Nigerien towns Bosso and Diffa, perpetrated by Boko Haram. The incident occurred on 6 February 2015, marking the first major Boko Haram incursion into Niger.

Background
In June 2013, between 5,000 and 10,000 refugees arrived in Bosso, fleeing fighting between Boko Haram and the Nigerian Armed Forces in Borno State of Nigeria. Most blamed the military for the excessive violence and human rights violations.

The border town of Diffa is separated from Nigeria by the Komadougou Yobe river, a recent drop in the river's water level granted large groups of Nigerian refugees the opportunity to flee rebel controlled areas into the yet unaffected Niger.

On 5 February 2015, a Nigerien parliament spokesman announced that discussions will be held regarding Niger's participation in the anti Boko Haram military operations.

Raid
In the morning of 6 February 2015, Boko Haram militants carried out an assault on the Nigerien towns of Bosso and Diffa, after crossing into Niger from neighboring Nigeria. The Nigerien military successfully repelled the attacks with the aid of Chadian troops that have been stationed in Bosso since 2 February, the Chadian airforce also played a supporting role in the clashes. Dozens of militants were killed as Boko Haram retreated back into its stronghold in Nigeria. Nigerien casualties amounted to 4 killed, plus several civilians as well as 17 wounded.

References

Attacks in Nigeria in 2015
Boko Haram attacks
Battles involving the Islamic State of Iraq and the Levant
Terrorist incidents in Africa in 2015
2015 in Niger
Conflicts in 2015
Terrorist incidents in Niger
February 2015 events in Africa
Islamic terrorist incidents in 2015